Michal Bílek (born 13 April 1965) is a football manager and former player. He led the Czech Republic national football team for four years between 2009 and 2013. As a player, he represented Czechoslovakia and the Czech Republic at international level. His playing position was right midfielder. Currently, he is the coach of Viktoria Plzeň.

Club career

During his career, Bílek was mainly associated with Sparta Prague, which he represented on four separate occasions, starting with the first team aged only 17.

In 1990, he had his first and only abroad experience, in Spain with Real Betis, being relegated in his first season, and returning to Sparta after another year. He then played for FK Viktoria Žižkov and FK Teplice until 2000, appearing once again for his main club in between.

Immediately after retiring, Bílek began coaching, precisely with Teplice. After a brief stint in Costa Rica, he returned home, going on to manage FK Chmel Blšany, FC Viktoria Plzeň and MFK Ružomberok. In 2006, he took charge of Sparta, replacing Stanislav Griga. He went on to win the Czech First League in his first year and finish second in the following. He resigned from his position at Sparta in May 2008.

International career
Bílek played for Czechoslovakia, and later briefly for the independent Czech Republic; for both he played a total of 35 matches and scored 11 goals, being an offensive mainstay for the former at the 1990 FIFA World Cup, scoring twice for the quarterfinalists.

In late October 2009, after having coached the nation's U19 team seven years earlier, former assistant Bílek was named the new coach of the senior side, following Ivan Hašek's resignation after the failure to qualify for the World Cup in South Africa. He was replaced as the national team boss in September 2013 after nearly four years in the role by Josef Pešice.

International goals
Scores and results list; Czechoslovakia's goal tally first.

Managerial statistics

References

External links
 
 
 

1965 births
Living people
Czech footballers
Czechoslovak footballers
Association football midfielders
Czech First League players
AC Sparta Prague players
FK Hvězda Cheb players
FK Viktoria Žižkov players
FK Teplice players
La Liga players
Real Betis players
Czechoslovakia international footballers
Czech Republic international footballers
Dual internationalists (football)
1990 FIFA World Cup players
Czech expatriate footballers
Czech football managers
Czech expatriate football managers
Czech First League managers
FK Teplice managers
FC Viktoria Plzeň managers
AC Sparta Prague managers
FC Fastav Zlín managers
Czech Republic national football team managers
Expatriate football managers in Slovakia
Expatriate football managers in Costa Rica
Czech expatriate sportspeople in Costa Rica
Expatriate football managers in Georgia (country)
MFK Ružomberok managers
UEFA Euro 2012 managers
Czechoslovak expatriate footballers
Expatriate footballers in Spain
Czechoslovak expatriate sportspeople in Spain
Czech expatriate sportspeople in Slovakia
FC Dinamo Tbilisi managers
FC Vysočina Jihlava managers
Footballers from Prague
Kazakhstan national football team managers
Czech expatriate sportspeople in Kazakhstan
Expatriate football managers in Kazakhstan
FC Astana managers